Pierre Thiolon (January 17, 1927 – April 14, 2014) was a French basketball player who competed in the 1948 Summer Olympics. He was part of the French basketball team, which won the silver medal.

References

1927 births
2014 deaths
French men's basketball players
Olympic basketball players of France
Basketball players at the 1948 Summer Olympics
Olympic silver medalists for France
Olympic medalists in basketball
Medalists at the 1948 Summer Olympics
Stade Français basketball players